Sugar Loaf Mountain, also known as Sugar Mountain, is a  summit located in the Alaska Range, near Denali National Park and Preserve, in Alaska, United States. The George Parks Highway and Alaska Railroad traverse the western base of this mountain as each passes through the Nenana River Gorge. Mount Healy, Sugar's nearest higher neighbor, is set  to the west across the gorge. This peak's local descriptive name was published in 1950 by the United States Geological Survey.

Climate
Based on the Köppen climate classification, Sugar Loaf Mountain is located in a subarctic climate zone with long, cold, snowy winters, and mild summers. Temperatures can drop below −20 °C with wind chill factors below −30 °C. The months May through June offer the most favorable weather for climbing or viewing. Precipitation runoff from the mountain drains into tributaries of the Nenana River, which in turn is part of the Tanana River drainage basin.

See also

List of mountain peaks of Alaska
Geology of Alaska

References

External links
 Weather forecast: Sugar Loaf Mountain
 Sugar Loaf Mountain hiking information with photos: thetrekplanner.com

Alaska Range
Mountains of Denali Borough, Alaska
Mountains of Alaska
North American 1000 m summits